A 120° parhelion (plural: 120° parhelia) is a relatively rare halo, an optical phenomenon occasionally appearing along with very bright sun dogs (also called parhelia) when ice crystal-saturated cirrus clouds fill the atmosphere. The 120° parhelia are named for appearing in pair on the parhelic circle ±120° from the sun.

When visible, 120° parhelia appear as white-bluish bright spots on the white parhelic circle and are the product of at least two interior reflections in the hexagonal ice crystals.  Their colour together with them being rather obscure can make observing them difficult as they tend to fuse with the clouds in the sky.

See also 
 Liljequist parhelion
 Subhelic arc

References

External links 
 A photo of a 120° parhelion in the Czech Republic in October 2006
 A photo by Joni Tornambe, 2006
 A video from Russia featuring both 120° parhelia, as well as the classic sundogs and parhelic circle, 2007 
 A similar video from Kazakhstan with very bright 120° parhelia, 2007  Warning: loud audio!

Atmospheric optical phenomena

fr:Parhélie#Paranthélies et parhélies secondaires